Herbert Renner (born 28 September 1946) is a German former professional footballer who played as a midfielder.

References

External links
 
 
 Herbert Renner at racingstub.com 

1946 births
Living people
Sportspeople from Fürth
German footballers
Association football midfielders
1. FC Nürnberg players
FC St. Gallen players
Ligue 1 players
RC Strasbourg Alsace players
1. FSV Mainz 05 players
2. Bundesliga players
German expatriate footballers
German expatriate sportspeople in France
Expatriate footballers in France
German expatriate sportspeople in Switzerland
Expatriate footballers in Switzerland
Footballers from Bavaria